The Bukharan People's Soviet Republic was a Soviet state that governed the former Emirate of Bukhara during the years immediately following the Russian Revolution. In 1924, its name was changed to the Bukharan Socialist Soviet Republic (Bukharan SSR). After the redrawing of regional borders, its territory was assigned mostly to the Uzbek SSR and some to the Turkmen SSR.

History 

In 1868, the Russian Empire forced the Emirate of Bukhara to accept protectorate status. Over the next 40 years, the Russians slowly eroded at Bukhara's territory, although never actually annexing the city of Bukhara itself. However, the emir could not shut out all outside influences, and gradually some of the disaffected youth of Bukhara gravitated to Pan-Turkism, inspired by the Young Turks in the Ottoman Empire, ideas taken from the Islamic Jadid reform movement, and the new Bolshevik-inspired communism. These various ideologies coalesced in the Young Bukharans (mladobukhartsy), led by Faizullah Khojaev.

Young Bukharans 
The Young Bukharans faced extreme obstacles as the emirate was dominated by conservative Sunni Islamic clergy. The ensuing conflict pitted the secular Young Bukharans and their Bolshevik supporters against the conservative pro-emir rebels, the Basmachi, in a conflict that lasted more than a decade.

In March 1918, the Young Bukharan activists informed the Bolsheviks that the Bukharan people were ready for the revolution and awaiting liberation from the emir. The Red Army marched to the gates of Bukhara and demanded that the emir surrender the city to the Young Bukharans. A Russian source reports that the emir responded by killing the Bolshevik delegation and incited the population to a jihad against the Bolshevik "infidels". Thousands of Russians were killed in these religious riots in Bukhara and the surrounding areas; many Young Bukharans were arrested and executed; the main railway and communication links from Bukhara to Chardjui and Samarkand were destroyed. 

However, the emir had won only a temporary respite. By August 1920 the Turkestan Bolsheviks advocated the liquidation of the Bukhara Emirate as a centre for counter-revolutionary forces. On 3 August 1920 the Bolsheviks and the Young Bukharans agreed to act together on the understanding that the Young Bukharans would join the Communist Party. On 16 August 1920 the 4th Congress of Bukharan Communist Party held in Bolshevik-controlled Chardjui decided to overthrow the emir. On 25 August 1920 the Politburo of the Russian Communist Party of Bolesheviks confirmed orders for the Revolutionary Military Council of Turkestan concerning the "Bukhara question".

On 28 August 1920, an army of well-disciplined and well equipped Red Army troops under the command of Bolshevik general Mikhail Frunze attacked the city of Bukhara. On 31 August 1920, the Emir Alim Khan fled to Dushanbe in Eastern Bukhara (later he escaped from Dushanbe to Kabul in Afghanistan). On 2 September 1920, after four days of fighting, the emir's citadel (the Ark) was destroyed, the red flag was raised from the top of Kalyan Minaret. On 14 September 1920, the All-Bukharan Revolutionary Committee was set up, headed by A. Mukhitdinov. The government – the Council of People's Nazirs (see nāẓir) – was presided over by Faizullah Khojaev.

Bukharan People's Soviet Republic 
The Bukharan People's Soviet Republic was proclaimed on 8 October 1920 under Fayzulla Khodzhayev. In Soviet terminology, the republic was a "revolutionary-democratic dictatorship of the proletariat and the peasantry", a transition stage to a Soviet Socialist Republic. A new constitution was adopted in September 1921, which, contrary to the Russian Constitution of 1918, allowed private ownership of land and productive assets and granted voting rights to non-proletarians (although relatives of the deposed emir, former emirate officials, and large landowners could not vote).

The overthrow of the emir was the impetus for the Basmachi Revolt, a conservative anti-communist rebellion. In 1922, most of the territory of the republic (East Bukhara, roughly from Hisor to West Pamir) was controlled by Basmachi, and it took the Red Army until 1926 to fully suppress the revolt.

During the first few years of the Russian Revolution, Lenin relied on a policy of encouraging local revolutions under the aegis of the local bourgeoisie, and in the early years of Bolshevik rule the Communists sought the assistance of the Jadid reformists in pushing through radical social and educational reforms. Just two weeks after the proclamation of the People's Republic, Communist Party membership in Bukhara soared to 14,000 as many local inhabitants were eager to prove their loyalty to the new regime. As the Soviet Union stabilized, it could afford to purge itself of so-called opportunists and potential nationalists. A series of expulsions stripped membership down to 1000 by 1922.

The above was reflected in the Bukharan People's Soviet Republic's flag, as designed upon its foundation, combining the Communist Hammer and Sickle with the traditional Crescent, which had appeared in the flag of the Emirate of Bukhara as well as in those of the Ottoman Empire and various other Islamic states. Conversely, the flags of the Soviet Republics among which the Bukharan territory was divided in 1925 featured the Hammer and Sickle alone, omitting the Crescent.

Bukharan Socialist Soviet Republic 
From 19 September 1924 to 17 February 1924, the Republic was known as the Bukharan Socialist Soviet Republic (Bukharan SSR). When new national boundaries were drawn up in 1924, the Bukharan SSR voted itself out of existence and became part of the new Uzbek SSR. Today the territory of the defunct Bukhara SSR lies mostly in Uzbekistan with parts in Tajikistan and Turkmenistan.

Khojaev, despite his Jadid background, became the first President of the Uzbek SSR. He was later purged and executed in the 1930s together with much of the intelligentsia of Central Asia.

Political leaders

Chairmen of the Central Revolutionary Committee 
(from 2 September to 6 October 1920, called Chairman of the Provisional Revolutionary Committee)

 Mirzo Abduqodir Mansurovich Mukhitdinov (02/09/1920 – 22/09/1921)
 Polat Usmon Khodzhayev (25/09/1921 – 08/12/1921)

Chairmen of the Presidium of the Central Executive Committee 

 Polat Usmon Khodzhayev (23/09/1921 – 12/04/1922)
 Muin Jon Aminov (12/04/1922 – 18/08/1922)
 Porsa Khodzhayev (18/08/1922 – 17/02/1925)

Chairmen of the Council of People’s Nazirs (Ministers) 

 Fayzulla Khodzhayev (08/10/1920 - 19/04/1923)
 Mirzo Abduqodir Mansurovich Mukhitdinov acting, period 15/06/1923 – 27/10/1924

Geography of partition 
During its entire existence from 1920 to 1924, the Bukharan PSR was a large enclave within the Turkestan Autonomous Soviet Socialist Republic (Turkestan ASSR) created in April 1918 on the territory of Russian Turkestan. Bukharan PSR, together with the Khorezm PSR, stretched from north-west to south-east in a belt that cut Turkestan ASSR into two separate parts: the small part in the south-west, corresponding to today's Turkmenistan (except a narrow strip along the southern bank of Amudarya, which was included in the Bukharan PSR), and the much larger part in the north-east, corresponding to sections of today's Uzbekistan, Tajikistan, Kyrgyzstan, and Kazakhstan. The southern border of the Bukharan PSR stretched from north-west to south-east along the southern bank of Amudarya to Termez and then along the Panj into West Pamir, reaching Langar at its south-eastern extreme point. It bordered Samarkand Oblast to the north-east and the southern part of Fergana Oblast to the east in West Pamir. The northern border of the People's Republic reached close to Khiva in the west and touched on what is today Karakalpakstan and Navoiy Region in Uzbekistan.

The People's Republic, like the Emirate of Bukhara that it succeeded, was divided into West Bukhara, including the cities of Bukhara and Karshi, and East Bukhara, roughly from Hisor to West Pamir. In the process of national delimitation of Central Asia in 1924, West Bukhara was included in the newly created Uzbek SSR (except for the south bank of Amudarya with the city of Chardjui, which went to Turkmen SSR), whereas East Bukhara, from Hisor to West Pamir, was ceded to Tajik Autonomous Soviet Socialist Republic (Tajik ASSR) and thus formed part of the Tajik SSR that was created later in 1929.

See also 

 Khorezm People's Soviet Republic
 History of Kyrgyzstan
 History of Kazakhstan
 History of Uzbekistan
 History of Tajikistan

References 

 
Communism in Uzbekistan
Communism in Tajikistan
Emirate of Bukhara
Former countries in Central Asia
Early Soviet republics
1920 establishments in Russia
1925 disestablishments in the Soviet Union
Russian-speaking countries and territories
States and territories established in 1920
States and territories disestablished in 1925
Soviet Central Asia
History of Bukhara
Former countries of the interwar period
Former socialist republics
Post–Russian Empire states